There are several municipalities and communities have the name Busswil in Switzerland:

Busswil bei Büren, in the Canton of Bern (pop: 1,905)
Busswil bei Melchnau, in the Canton of Bern  (pop: 194)
Busswil TG, in the Canton of Thurgau